Waltonville is a village in Jefferson County, Illinois, United States. The population was 434 at the 2010 census. It is part of the Mount Vernon Micropolitan Statistical Area.

History 

There were a series of small settlements near Waltonville prior to its formation. In 1840, Eli Gilbert dammed Rayse Creek about a mile northeast of Waltonville, near the point where the Mt. Vernon/Pinckneyville road crossed the creek. He built a saw mill, grist mill and store at this location, which was called "Mill Town". In 1860, Knob Creek Post Office was opened there. This was in McClellan Township.

In 1867, a settlement called Williamsburg was started, about a half mile west of Mill Town. This was in Knob Prairie, Blissville Township, just to the north of the present town of Waltonville. Knob Prairie owes its name to a steep hill, or knob, that arises just to the northwest of Waltonville. The town's water tower sits atop the knob.

Williamsburg was platted in 1867. It was possibly named for the surveyor, J. D. Williams. Williamsburg was at the intersection of the Shawneetown/Nashville and Mt. Vernon/Pinckneyville roads, neither of which exist any more. After the post office refused to recognize the "Williamsburg" name, it was called the "Laur Post Office", after Capt. Joseph Laur, who commanded a local company in the Civil War.

Waltonville, to the south of the knob, started as a small store owned by Rob Mannen. The town was named for his mother, Eliza A. Walton Mannen. The town took off in 1893 with the completion of a rail line from Mt. Vernon to Chester. Williamsburg moved down to the new rail depot. The rail line is now part of the Union Pacific system.

The Universalist Church existed in Williamsburg prior to 1870, and moved to Waltonville before 1906. This church was still operating as late as 1980. Waltonville was for many years the smallest town in the United States to have a Universalist Church. This may be another reflection of the numerous obscure ethnic groups that maintained an identity in the rural coal fields of Southern Illinois.

Many underground coal mines were opened near Waltonville. Immigrants came to work these mines, mainly from Poland. By the 1950s, the rural areas west of Waltonville were predominantly Polish, and the main language spoken was Polish. That language slowly faded with the advent of television. Today, only a few people speak any Polish. Many still identify as Polish, though, and they continue to attend St. Barbara's Catholic Church in nearby Scheller.

Geography
Waltonville is located in southwestern Jefferson County. Illinois Route 148 passes through the southeast part of the village, leading northeast  to Mount Vernon, the county seat, and south  to Sesser.

Waltonville is in the northeast corner of Bald Hill Township, the southeast corner of Blissville Township, the southeast corner of McClellan Township, and the northwest corner of Elk Prairie Township. Most of the developed parts of the village are in Bald Hill and Elk Prairie townships.

Blissville Township was named in honor of Augustus Bliss, who lived in nearby Casner Township, and who started a settlement in 1841. Bliss caught the gold fever in 1849, but died of cholera on his way to California.

Demographics

As of the census of 2000, there were 422 people, 177 households, and 121 families residing in the village. The racial makeup of the village was 98.82% White, 0.47% Native American, and 0.71% from two or more races. Hispanic or Latino of any race were 1.18% of the population.

There were 177 households, out of which 32.2% had children under the age of 18 living with them, 54.8% were married couples living together, 9.0% had a female householder with no husband present, and 31.1% were non-families. 30.5% of all households were made up of individuals, and 18.1% had someone living alone who was 65 years of age or older.  The average household size was 2.38 and the average family size was 2.97.

In the village, the population was spread out, with 27.7% under the age of 18, 5.7% from 18 to 24, 31.3% from 25 to 44, 17.5% from 45 to 64, and 17.8% who were 65 years of age or older .  The median age was 35 years. For every 100 females, there were 86.7 males.  For every 100 females age 18 and over, there were 89.4 males.

The median income for a household in the village was $24,318, and the median income for a family was $32,750. Males had a median income of $26,607 versus $16,875 for females. The per capita income for the village was $12,233.  About 12.9% of families and 16.6% of the population were below the poverty line, including 13.4% of those under age 18 and 22.9% of those age 65 or over.

References

History of Jefferson County, Illinois, Perrin, 1883
Prairie Historian, Waltonville, Illinois

External links
History of Jefferson County, Illinois

Villages in Jefferson County, Illinois
Villages in Illinois
Mount Vernon, Illinois micropolitan area
Populated places established in 1893